Lakelands is a rural community in Cumberland County, Nova Scotia.  It is located north of Parrsboro.

References

Communities in Cumberland County, Nova Scotia